Bal Vidya Mandir (aka BVM) is an English medium, co-educational Senior Secondary Residential/Day School located in Lucknow, India. It was founded in 1963 by then Chief Minister of Uttar Pradesh, Chandra Bhanu Gupta, The school is fully affiliated to CBSE, imparts education from Nursery to Class XII (10+2). It is situated on the Motilal Nehru Marg opposite to Charbagh Railway Station, Station Road, Lucknow. The school celebrated its semicentennial in the year 2014. Now the school has launched new teachings schemes also.

History
The school was founded in 1963 by Chandra Bhanu Gupta, the then Chief Minister of Uttar Pradesh, under the auspices of the Motilal Memorial Society. The foundation stone of this school was laid by Shri Lal Bahadur Shastri, the then Prime Minister of India, on 19 November 1964.

Academics

The school follows the scheme of CCE up to Class X. In Class XI and Class XII, the institute offers three following streams: 
 Science Physics, Chemistry, Mathematics/Biology, Hindi/Computer Science, English and Commercial Arts), 
 Commerce (Mathematics/Hindi/Computer Science, Economics, Accounts, Business Studies, English and Physical Education) and 
 Humanities (Geography, History/Fashion Studies, Economics/Hindi, Psychology, English and Physical Education).

House system

Each student is allocated to one house and the school is divided into four houses:
 Laxmibai House
 Meerabai House
 Shankaracharya House
 Vivekanand House
The school organizes various inter-house competitions throughout the year.

Publications
The school's annual magazine, Bal Jyoti, includes articles written by students and coverage of the events throughout the academic session.

References

External links
 Bal Vidya Mandir, Lucknow - Official Website

Primary schools in Uttar Pradesh
High schools and secondary schools in Uttar Pradesh
Schools in Lucknow
Educational institutions established in 1963
1963 establishments in Uttar Pradesh